Carex fedia is a tussock-forming species of perennial sedge in the family Cyperaceae. It is native to parts of Asia from Tajikistan in the west through to Vietnam in the east.

See also
List of Carex species

References

fedia
Plants described in 1834
Taxa named by Christian Gottfried Daniel Nees von Esenbeck
Flora of Tajikistan
Flora of Afghanistan
Flora of Bangladesh
Flora of China
Flora of Myanmar
Flora of Nepal
Flora of Pakistan
Flora of Thailand
Flora of Vietnam